Martyna Jelińska (born 5 May 1992) is a Polish fencer. She competed in the women's foil event at the 2020 Summer Olympics. In 2017, she won the bronze medal in the women's team foil event at the 2017 Summer Universiade held in Taipei, Taiwan. She also competed in the women's individual foil event.

References

External links
 

1992 births
Living people
Polish female fencers
Polish female foil fencers
Universiade medalists in fencing
Universiade bronze medalists for Poland
Medalists at the 2017 Summer Universiade
Olympic fencers of Poland
Fencers at the 2020 Summer Olympics
Sportspeople from Toruń
21st-century Polish women